The Peru national football team represents Peru in men's international football. The national team has been organised, since 1927, by the Peruvian Football Federation (FPF). The FPF constitutes one of the ten members of FIFA's South American Football Confederation (CONMEBOL). Peru has won the Copa América twice, and has qualified for the FIFA World Cup five times (last appearing in 2018); the team also participated in the 1936 Olympic football competition and has reached the semi-finals of the CONCACAF Gold Cup. The team plays most of its home matches at the Estadio Nacional in Lima, the country's capital.

The team is well known for its white shirts adorned with a diagonal red stripe, which combine Peru's national colours. This basic design has been used continuously since 1936, and gives rise to the team's common Spanish nickname, la Blanquirroja ("the white-and-red"). Peruvian football fans are known for their distinctive cheer ¡Arriba Perú! ("Onward Peru!"). Peru has a longstanding rivalry with Chile.

The Peru national team enjoyed its most successful periods thanks to footballing generations from the 1930s and the 1970s. The 1930s generation led Peru at the inaugural FIFA World Cup in 1930 and won the 1938 Bolivarian Games and the 1939 Copa América, with goalkeeper Juan Valdivieso and forwards Teodoro Fernández and Alejandro Villanueva playing important roles. The 1970s generation qualified Peru for three World Cups and won the Copa América in 1975; the team then notably included defender Héctor Chumpitaz and the forward partnership of Hugo Sotil and Teófilo Cubillas, often regarded as Peru's greatest player.

The national team's all-time top goalscorer is Paolo Guerrero, with 38 goals, and its most-capped player is Roberto Palacios, with 128 appearances. Since August 2022, Peru is managed by former team captain Juan Reynoso.

History 

During the 19th century, British immigrants and Peruvians returning from England introduced football to Peru. In 1859, members of the British community in the country's capital founded the Lima Cricket Club, Peru's first organisation dedicated to the practice of cricket, rugby, and football. These new sports became popular among the local upper-class over the following decades, but early developments stopped due to the War of the Pacific that Peru fought against Chile from 1879 to 1883. After the war, Peru's coastal society embraced football as a modern innovation. In Lima's barrios, football became a popular daily activity, encouraged by bosses who wanted it to inspire solidarity and productivity among their workers. In the adjacent port of Callao and other commercial areas, British civilian workers and sailors played the sport among themselves and with locals. Sports rivalries between locals and foreigners arose in Callao, and between elites and workers in Lima—as foreigners departed, this became a rivalry between Callao and Lima. These factors, coupled with the sport's rapid growth among the urban poor of Lima's La Victoria district (where, in 1901, the Alianza Lima club formed), led to Peru developing the Andean region's strongest footballing culture, and, according to historian Andreas Campomar, "some of the most elegant and accomplished football on the continent".

The Peruvian Football League, founded in 1912, held annual competitions until it disbanded in 1921 amid disputes amongst its clubs. The Peruvian Football Federation (FPF), formed in 1922, reorganised the annual tournament in 1926. The FPF joined the South American Football Confederation (CONMEBOL) in 1925 and, after restructuring its finances, formed the Peru national football team in 1927. The team debuted in the 1927 South American Championship, hosted by the FPF at Lima's Estadio Nacional. Peru lost 0–4 against Uruguay in its first match, and won 3–2 over Bolivia in its second. Peru did not advance beyond the first stage of the inaugural FIFA World Cup in 1930.

The 1930s were the team's first golden era, when they improved their game through play with more experienced teams. The Combinado del Pacífico (a squad composed of Chilean and Peruvian footballers) toured Europe from 1933 to 1934. Starting with Ciclista Lima in 1926, Peru's football clubs toured Latin America with much success. During one of these tours—Alianza Lima's undefeated journey through Chile in 1935—emerged the Rodillo Negro ("Black Roller"), a skillful group led by forwards Alejandro Villanueva, Teodoro Fernández and goalkeeper Juan Valdivieso. Sports historian Richard Witzig described these three as "a soccer triumvirate unsurpassed in the world at that time", citing their combined innovation and effectiveness at both ends of the field. Peru and the Rodillo Negro impressed at the 1936 Summer Olympics, won the inaugural Bolivarian Games in 1938, and finished the decade as South American champions.

Historian David Goldblatt assessed the decline of its previous success: "despite all the apparent preconditions for footballing growth and success, Peruvian football disappeared". He attributes this sudden decline to Peruvian authorities' repression of "social, sporting and political organisations among the urban and rural poor" during the 1940s and 1950s. Nevertheless, Peru performed creditably at the South American Championships, placing third in Brazil 1949 and Chile 1955, and missed qualification for the Sweden 1958 World Cup finals, over two legs to eventual champions Brazil.

Successes during the late 1960s, including qualification for the Mexico 1970 World Cup finals, ushered in a second golden period for Peruvian football. The formidable forward partnership between Teófilo Cubillas and Hugo Sotil was a key factor in Peru's triumphs during the 1970s. Peru reached the quarter-finals in 1970, losing to the tournament winners Brazil, and earned the first FIFA Fair Play Trophy; historian Richard Henshaw describes Peru as "the surprise of the 1970 competition, showing flair and a high level of skill". Five years later, Peru became South American champions for the second time when it won the 1975 Copa América (the then-rechristened South American Championship). The team next qualified for two consecutive World Cup finals, reaching the second round in Argentina 1978 and the first group stage in Spain 1982. Peru's early elimination in 1982 marked the end of the side's globally-admired "flowing football". Peru, nonetheless, barely missed the Mexico 1986 World Cup finals after placing second in a qualification group to eventual champions Argentina.

By the late 1980s, renewed expectations for Peru were centred on a young generation of Alianza Lima players known colloquially as Los Potrillos ("The Colts"). Sociologists Aldo Panfichi and Victor Vich write that Los Potrillos "became the hope of the entire country"—fans expected them to qualify for the Italy 1990 World Cup finals. These hopes were dashed when the national team entered a hiatus after its manager and several of its players died in a plane crash carrying most of Alianza's team and staff in 1987. Peru subsequently only came close to reaching the France 1998 World Cup finals, missing qualification on goal difference, but would go on to win the 1999 Kirin Cup tournament in Japan (sharing the title with Belgium) and reached the semi-finals at the 2000 CONCACAF Gold Cup (contested as an invitee).

Qualification for the FIFA World Cup finals continued being an elusive objective for Peru during the early 21st century. According to historian Charles F. Walker, player indiscipline problems marred Peru's national team and football league. Troubles in the FPF, particularly with its then-president Manuel Burga, deepened the crisis in Peruvian football—FIFA temporarily suspended the country from international competition, in late 2008, because the Peruvian government investigated alleged corruption within the FPF. Burga's twelve-year tenure as FPF president, deemed by journalists and the public as disastrous for the national team despite a third place at the 2011 Copa América, ended in 2014. The FPF's new leadership appointed Juan Carlos Oblitas as the federation's new director and Ricardo Gareca as Peru's manager in March 2015. Gareca is credited by sports journalists as revitalizing Peru's football prowess by improving the players' training and professional sports conduct. Under Gareca, Peru achieved third place in the 2015 Copa América, reached the quarter-finals of the Copa América Centenario, participated in the group stage of the Russia 2018 World Cup finals, and finished runners-up at the 2019 Copa América.

Kit 

The Peru national football team plays in red and white, Peru's national colours. Its first-choice kit has been, since 1936, white shorts, white socks, and white shirts with a distinctive red "sash" crossing their front diagonally from the proper left shoulder to the right hip and returning on the back from the right hip to the proper left shoulder. This basic scheme has been only slightly altered over the years.

Peru's kit has won praise as one of world football's most attractive designs. Christopher Turpin, the executive producer of NPR's All Things Considered news show, lauded the 1970 iteration as "the beautiful game's most beautiful shirt", also describing it as "retro even in 1970". Miles Kohrman, football reporter for The New Republic, commended Peru's kit as "one of soccer's best-kept secrets". Rory Smith, Chief Soccer Correspondent for The New York Times, referred to Peru's 2018 version of the jersey as "a classic" with a nostalgic, fan-pleasing "blood-red sash". The version worn in 1978 came first in a 2010 ESPN list of the "Best World Cup jerseys of all time", described therein as "simple yet strikingly effective".

Peru's first kit, made for the 1927 South American Championship, comprised a white-and-red striped shirt, white shorts and black socks. At the 1930 World Cup, Peru used an alternate design because Paraguay had already registered a similar kit with white-and-red striped shirts. The Peruvians instead wore white shirts with a red collar, white shorts and black socks. The team added a horizontal red stripe to the shirt for the 1935 South American Championship. The following year, at the 1936 Berlin Olympics, the team adopted the iconic diagonal red sash design it has retained ever since. According to historian Jaime Pulgar-Vidal Otálora, the idea for the design came from school football matches in which coloured sashes worn over the shoulder would allow two teams wearing white shirts to play against each other.

Peru wears as its badge the emblem of the Peruvian Football Federation. The first badge, presented in 1927, had a heater shield design with the country's name and the federation's acronym (FPF). Eight different emblems followed, with the longest-lasting design being the modern French escutcheon form emblazoned in the team's jersey from 1953 until 2014. This design had the Peruvian flag at its base, and either the country's name or the federation's acronym at its chief. Since 2014, the badge has a retro-inspired heater shield design, with the entire field comprised by Peru's flag and the federation's acronym, surrounded by a gold-colored frame.

Eight sportswear manufacturers have supplied Peru's national team. The first, the German company Adidas, supplied the team's kit in 1978 and 1983–1985. The FPF has signed contracts with manufacturers from Brazil (Penalty, 1981–82), Canada (Power, 1989–1991), Italy (Diadora, 1991–1992), England (Umbro, 1996–1997, 2010–2018), and another from Germany (Puma, 1987–1989). The team has also been supplied by three local firms: Calvo Sporwear (1986–1987), Polmer (1993–1995), and Walon Sport (1998–2010). Since August 2018, the Ecuadorian Marathon Sports produce Peru's kit.

Stadium 

The traditional home of Peruvian football is the country's national stadium, the Estadio Nacional in Lima, which seats 45,000 spectators. The present ground is the Estadio Nacional's third incarnation, renovated under the Alan García administration. Its official re-inauguration, 24 July 2011, marked 88 years to the day after the original ground opened on the same site in 1923.

To celebrate the centenary of Peru's independence from Spain, Lima's British community donated the original Estadio Nacional, a wooden structure with a capacity of 6,000. Construction began on 28 July 1921, overseen by President Augusto B. Leguía. The stadium's re-inauguration on 27 October 1952, under the Manuel A. Odría administration, followed an onerous campaign for its renovation led by Miguel Dasso, president of the Sociedad de Beneficencia de Lima. The renovated stadium boasted a cement structure and larger spectator capacity of 53,000. Its last redevelopment, in 2011, included the construction of a plaque-covered exterior, an internal multicoloured illumination system, two giant LED screens, and 375 private suites.

A distinctive feature of the ground is the Miguel Dasso Tower on its north side, which contains luxury boxes (renovated in 2004). The Estadio Nacional currently has a natural bermudagrass pitch, reinstalled as part of redevelopments completed in 2011. Previously, the FPF had installed artificial turf in the stadium for the 2005 FIFA U-17 World Championship, making it the only national stadium in CONMEBOL with such a turf. Despite the synthetic ground's rating of "FIFA Star II", the highest certification granted to artificial pitches, players accused the turf of causing them injuries, such as burns and bruises.

Peru sometimes play home matches at other venues. Outside the desert-like coast region of Lima, the thin atmosphere at the high-altitude Estadio Garcilaso de la Vega in Cusco has been described as providing strategic advantages for Peru against certain visiting teams. Other common alternate venues for the national team include two other grounds in the Peruvian capital—Alianza's Estadio Alejandro Villanueva and Universitario's Estadio Monumental.

The national team's training grounds are located within the Villa Deportiva Nacional (VIDENA) sports complex in Lima's San Luis district. Since 1981, the complex is managed by the Peruvian Institute of Sport (IPD). In 2017, following Peru's qualification for the Russia 2018 World Cup finals, the Peruvian Football Federation announced the creation of a new complex, the Center of National Teams, in Lima's Chaclacayo district. The new complex will contain six training grounds for both the male and the female squads, including the senior and the youth sides.

Supporters 

Football has been the most popular sport in Peru since the early 20th century. Originally largely exclusive to Lima's Anglophile elite and expatriates, and secluded from the rest of the city, football became an integral part of wider popular culture during the 1900s and 1910s. Over the following decades, Augusto Leguía's government institutionalised the sport into a national pastime by promoting and organising its development. Consequently, the national football team became an important element of Peru's national identity. According to the historian Carlos Aguirre, nationalist fervor spiked during the qualification phase for the 1970 World Cup finals, because the revolutionary government of General Juan Velasco Alvarado tied the national team's success with the alleged cultural, social, and psychological changes spurred by the country's new political project.

Peruvian football fans are known for their distinctive cheer ¡Arriba Perú! ("Onward Peru!"), unabating popular chant ¡Vamos peruanos! (Let's go Peruvians!), as well as for their use of traditional Peruvian música criolla to express support, both at national team games and at club matches. Música criolla attained national and international recognition with the advent of mass media during the 1930s, becoming a recognised symbol of Peru and its culture. The national team's most popular anthems are Peru Campeón, a polca criolla (Peruvian polka) glorifying Peru's qualification for the Mexico 1970 World Cup, and Contigo Perú, a vals criollo (Peruvian waltz) that newspaper El Comercio calls "the hymn of Peruvian national football teams". In 2018, a FIFA-sanctioned worldwide online poll honoured the "fervent and dedicated group" of Peruvian supporters at that year's World Cup tournament with the FIFA Fan Award.

The Estadio Nacional disaster of 24 May 1964, involving Peruvian supporters, is cited as one of the worst tragedies in football history. During a qualifying match for the 1964 Olympics between Peru's under-20 team and its counterpart from Argentina, the Uruguayan referee Angel Payos disallowed a would-be Peruvian equaliser, alleging rough play. Spectators threw missiles from the stands while two fans invaded the pitch and attacked the referee. Police threw tear gas into the crowd, causing a stampede; trying to escape, fans were crushed against the stadium's locked gates. A total of 315 people died in the chaos, with more than 500 others injured.

Rivalries 

The Peru national football team maintains prominent rivalries with its counterparts from neighbouring Chile and Ecuador. The Peruvians have a favourable record against Ecuador and a negative record against Chile. Peru faced both rivals in the 1939 South American Championship in Lima, which also marked the first time that Peru faced Ecuador in an official tournament; Peru won both games. Peru also defeated its rivals during qualifying for the Argentina 1978 World Cup, directly eliminating both teams.

The Chile–Peru football rivalry is known in Spanish as the Clásico del Pacífico ("Pacific Derby"). CNN World Sport editor Greg Duke ranks it among the top ten football rivalries in the world. Peru first faced Chile in the 1935 South American Championship, defeating it 1–0. The football rivalry between Peru and Chile, partly a reflection of the geopolitical conflict between both neighboring states, is primarily a result of both football squads vying for recognition as the better team in South America's Pacific coast—as their football confederation is historically dominated by countries in South America's Atlantic coast. The two countries traditionally compete with each other over the rank of fourth-best national team in South America (after Argentina, Brazil, and Uruguay). They also both claim to have invented the bicycle kick; Peruvians call it the chalaca, while it is the chilena in Chile.

The rivalry between the Ecuador and Peru football teams is rooted in the historical border conflict between the two nations dating back to the 19th century. In 1995, after the brief Cenepa War, CONMEBOL contemplated altering that year's Copa América group stage to prevent a match between the two sides, but ultimately did not. According to cultural historian Michael Handelsman, Ecuadorian fans consider losses to Colombia or Peru "an excuse to lament Ecuador's inability to establish itself as an international soccer power". Handelsman adds that "[t]he rivalries are intense, and the games always carry an element of national pride and honor".

Results and fixtures

The following is a list of match results in the last 12 months, as well as any future matches that have been scheduled.

2022

2023

Coaching staff

Managers 

A total of 43 managers have led the Peru national football team since 1927 (including multiple spells separately); of these, 36 have been from Peru and 23 have been from abroad. Sports analysts and historians generally consider Peru's most successful managers to have been the Englishman Jack Greenwell and the Peruvian Marcos Calderón. The former managed Peru to triumph in the 1938 Bolivarian Games and the 1939 South American Championship, and the latter led Peru to victory in the 1975 Copa América tournament and coached it at the 1978 FIFA World Cup. Three other managers have led Peru to tournament victories—Juan Carlos Oblitas, Freddy Ternero, and Sergio Markarián each oversaw Peru's victory in the Kirin Cup in Japan, in 1999, 2005 and 2011, respectively.

Soon after forming Peru's national football team, the FPF invited Uruguayan coaches Pedro Olivieri and Julio Borelli to manage the squad. Olivieri received the FPF's first appointment, for the 1927 South American Championship, due to his prior experience managing Uruguay. Borelli became the national team's second manager, for the 1929 South American Championship, after some years of refereeing football matches in Peru. The Spaniard Francisco Bru, Peru's third manager and first World Cup coach at the inaugural tournament in 1930, previously had been Spain's first manager. The FPF next appointed the national team's first Peruvian coach, Telmo Carbajo, for the 1935 South American Championship. The team's manager since August 2022 is the Peruvian Juan Reynoso.

Managers that brought outstanding changes to the Peru national team's style of play include the Hungarian György Orth and the Brazilians Didi and Tim. Orth coached Peru from 1957 to 1959; sports historian Andreas Campomar cites Peru's "4–1 thrashing of England in Lima" as evidence of Orth's positive influence over the national team's offensive game. Víctor Benítez, Peru's defensive midfielder under Orth, attributes the Hungarian with maximizing the team's potential by accurately placing each player in their optimal positions. Didi coached Peru from 1968 to 1970 and managed it at the 1970 FIFA World Cup; Campomar attributes Didi's tactics as the reason for Peru's development of a "free-flowing football" style. Placar, a Brazilian sports journal, attributed Tim, who managed Peru at the 1982 FIFA World Cup, with making Peru "a team that plays beautiful, combining efficiency with that swagger that people thought only existed in Brazil".

Players

Current squad 
The following players were called up for the friendly matches against Germany and Morocco on 25 and 28 March 2023.

Caps and goals are correct as of 19 November 2022, after the match against Bolivia.

Recent call-ups
The players listed below were not included in the current squad, but have been called up by Peru in the last twelve months.

COV Withdrew due to COVID-19
INJ Withdrew due to injury
PRE Preliminary squad
SUS Suspended
WD Withdrew from the squad

Notable 

A report published by CONMEBOL in 2008 described Peru as traditionally exhibiting an "elegant, technical and fine football style", and praised it as "one of the most loyal exponents of South American football talent". In 2017, Argentine manager Ricardo Gareca described Peruvian footballers as "technically sound, [physically] strong and adaptable", adding that their adaptability resulted from Peru's diverse geography.

Peruvian players noted in the CONMEBOL report as "true artists of the ball" include forwards Teófilo Cubillas, Pedro Pablo León and Hugo Sotil, defender Héctor Chumpitaz and midfielders Roberto Challe, César Cueto, José del Solar, and Roberto Palacios. Cubillas, an attacking midfielder and forward popularly known as El Nene ("The Kid"), is widely regarded as Peru's greatest ever player. Chumpitaz is often cited as the team's best defender; Witzig lists him among his "Best Players of the Modern Era", and praises him as "a strong reader of the game with excellent ball skills and distribution, [who] marshalled a capable defence to support Peru's attack". El Gráfico, an Argentine sports journal, described Cueto, Cubillas, and José Velásquez as, collectively, "the best [midfield] in the world" in 1978.

Before Cubillas' appearance, Teodoro "Lolo" Fernández, a forward nicknamed El Cañonero ("The Cannoneer"), held the status of Peru's greatest player—due to his powerful shots, marksmanship, and club loyalty to Universitario. Fernández participated as a key member of the Rodillo Negro team of the 1930s, along with Alejandro Villanueva and Juan Valdivieso. Fernández scored most of the team's goals; his partner in attack, the gifted playmaker Villanueva, awed audiences with his acrobatic skills. Goalkeeper Valdivieso had a reputation as a penalty stopper with exceptional athleticism.

In 1972, teams representing Europe and South America played a commemorative match in Basel, Switzerland, for the benefit of homeless children. Cubillas, Chumpitaz, Sotil, and Julio Baylón played in the South American team, which won the game 2–0; Cubillas scored the first goal. The teams held another match the following year, at Barcelona's Camp Nou, with the declared intent of fighting global poverty. Cubillas, Chumpitaz, and Sotil again participated, with Chumpitaz named South America's captain. Each of the Peruvians scored in a 4–4 draw, which South America won 7–6 on penalties.

Team records 

The Peru national football team has played 645 matches since 1927, including friendlies. The largest margin of victory achieved by a Peru side was a 9–1 win against Ecuador on 11 August 1938, at the Bolivarian Games in Colombia. The team's record defeat was a 7–0 loss to Brazil at the 1997 Copa América in Bolivia.

The Peruvian player with the most international caps is Roberto Palacios, who made 128 appearances for the side from 1992 to 2007. The player with the second-most caps is Yoshimar Yotún with 108; Paolo Guerrero is third with 106. The Peruvian goalkeeper with the most appearances is Pedro Gallese with 78. The goalkeeper with the second-most caps is Óscar Ibáñez with 50; Miguel Miranda is third with 47.

The team's all-time top goalscorer is Paolo Guerrero, with 38 goals in 106 appearances. He is followed by Jefferson Farfán, with 27 goals in 97 appearances, and Teófilo Cubillas, who scored 26 goals in 81 appearances. Of the top ten scorers for Peru, Teodoro Fernández, with 24 goals in 32 games, holds the best goal-per-appearance ratio (0.75 goals/match). Claudio Pizarro scored Peru's fastest ever goal, coming less than a minute into a match against Mexico on 20 August 2003.

Peru's current captain is goalkeeper Pedro Gallese. Midfielder Leopoldo Basurto was the team's first captain. Defender Héctor Chumpitaz held the Peruvian team's leadership position for the longest time, between 1965 and 1981. Forward Claudio Pizarro had the second-longest tenure as captain, from 2003 to 2016. Other notable captains include Rubén Díaz (1981–1985), Julio César Uribe (1987–1989), Juan Reynoso (1993–1999), and Nolberto Solano (2000–2003).

Competitive records

FIFA World Cup 

Peru has taken part in the World Cup finals five times. The Peruvian team competed at the first World Cup in 1930 by invitation, and has entered each tournament at the qualifying stage since 1958, qualifying for the finals four times: in 1970, 1978, 1982 and 2018. Its all-time record in World Cup qualifying matches, as of 2017, stands at 43 wins, 37 draws and 69 losses. In the finals, the team has won five matches, drawn three and lost ten, with 21 goals in favour and 33 against. Peru won the inaugural FIFA Fair Play Trophy, awarded at the 1970 World Cup, having been the only team not to receive any yellow or red cards during the competition. Peru has the peculiar distinction of always facing the tournament's eventual winners during the finals phase.

Luis de Souza Ferreira scored Peru's first World Cup goal on 14 July 1930, in a match against Romania. José Velásquez scored Peru's fastest World Cup finals goal—that is, that scored soonest after kick-off—two minutes into the match against Iran on 11 June 1978. Jefferson Farfán is Peru's top scorer and fifth-overall top scorer in CONMEBOL World Cup qualification, with 16 goals. Teófilo Cubillas is the team's top scorer in the World Cup finals, with 10 goals in 13 games. During the 1930 competition, a Peruvian became the first player sent off in a World Cup—his identity is disputed between sources as either defender Plácido Galindo or midfielder Mario de las Casas. Peru's Ramón Quiroga holds the unusual record of being the only goalkeeper to commit a foul in the opponent's side of the pitch in a match at the World Cup finals.

Copa América 

Peru's national team has taken part in 33 editions of the Copa América since 1927, and has won the competition twice (in 1939 and 1975). The country has hosted the tournament six times (in 1927, 1935, 1939, 1953, 1957 and 2004). Peru's overall record in the competition is 52 victories, 33 draws, and 57 losses. Peru won the Fair Play award in the 2015 edition.

Demetrio Neyra scored Peru's first goal in the competition on 13 November 1927, in a match against Bolivia. Christian Cueva scored Peru's fastest Copa América goal, two minutes into the match against Brazil on 14 June 2015. Four tournaments have featured a Peruvian top scorer—Teodoro Fernández in 1939 and Paolo Guerrero in 2011, 2015, and 2019. Fernández, the Copa América's third-overall scorer, was named best player of the 1939 tournament; Teófilo Cubillas, voted the best player in the 1975 competition, is the only other Peruvian to win this award.

Peru earned its first continental title in 1939, when it won the South American Championship with successive victories over Ecuador, Chile, Paraguay and Uruguay. This marked the first time that the competition had been won by a team other than Uruguay, Brazil, or Argentina. Peru became South American champions for the second time in 1975, when it won that year's Copa América, the first to feature all ten CONMEBOL members. Peru came top of their group in the first round, eliminating Chile and Bolivia, and in the semi-finals drew with Brazil over two legs, winning 3–1 in Brazil but losing 2–0 at home. Peru was declared the winner by drawing of lots. In the two-legged final between Colombia and Peru, both teams won their respective home games (1–0 in Bogota and 2–0 in Lima), forcing a play-off in Caracas that Peru won 1–0.

CONCACAF Gold Cup 

Peru competed in the CONCACAF Gold Cup's fifth edition in 2000. Peru participated, along with Colombia and South Korea, as that year's invitees. The Peruvian team's overall record in the tournament is 1 victory, 1 draw, and 2 losses.

Ysrael Zúñiga scored Peru's first goal in the competition on 14 February 2000, in a match against Haiti. Roberto Palacios, the team's top scorer with two goals in four matches, received a spot in that year's "team of the tournament", comprising the competition's eleven best players.

Peru progressed past the North American tournament's first stage, despite not winning any of its matches, as the second-best ranked team in Group B behind the United States. Peru next defeated Honduras 5–3 in a heated quarter-finals match that ended a minute early due to a pitch invasion by irate Honduran fans. Colombia defeated Peru 2–1 in the semi-finals, in a match that included an own goal from Peru's Marcial Salazar.

Olympic Games 

Peru's senior side has competed in the Olympic football tournament once, at the 1936 Summer Olympics in Berlin, Germany. The multiracial 1936 team has been latterly described by historian David Goldblatt as "the jewel of the country's first Olympic delegation". It had a record of two victories, scoring 11 goals and conceding 5.

Teodoro Fernández scored Peru's first goal in the tournament in the match against Finland on 6 August, and finished as the team's top scorer with six goals in two games, including Peru's only hat-trick at the Olympics.

The 1935 South American Championship in Lima acted as the qualifying stage for the 1936 Olympic tournament. Uruguay won undefeated and Argentina came second, but neither took up their Olympic spot because of economic issues. Peru, who had come third, duly represented South America. The Peruvian team began the competition with a 7–3 win over Finland, after which it faced Austria, managed by Jimmy Hogan and popularly known as the Wunderteam, in the quarter-finals. After the game ended 2–2, Peru scored twice in extra time to win 4–2. Peru expected to then face Poland in the semi-finals, but events off the pitch led to the withdrawal of Peru's Olympic delegation before the match.

See also 

 Peru national football team indiscipline scandals
 Peru women's national football team
 Peru Olympic football team
 Peru national under-20 football team
 Peru national under-17 football team
 Peru national beach soccer team
 Peru national futsal team
 Peruvian Primera División
 Sport in Peru

Bibliography

Notes and references

Notes

References

External links 

 
 Peru profile on FIFA.com
 ELO team records

 
1927 establishments in Peru
South American national association football teams
Association football clubs established in 1927